Trichloroethane (CHCl) may refer to either of two isomeric chemical compounds:

 1,1,1-Trichloroethane (methyl chloroform, CClCH)
 1,1,2-Trichloroethane (vinyl trichloride, CHClCHCl)